Hartsville and Hartville can refer to:

Canada
Hartsville, Prince Edward Island, in the township of Lot 22, Prince Edward Island

United States
Hartsville, Indiana
Hartsville, New York
Hartsville, Pennsylvania
Hartsville, South Carolina
North Hartsville, South Carolina
Hartsville, Tennessee
Hartville, Missouri
Hartville, Ohio
Hartville, Wyoming